Sun Monticello, formerly Monticello Grand Casino, is a casino and hotel, situated in Mostazal, Chile.

History 
The complex was developed by a joint venture between International Group of Gaming Resorts (IGGR) and Sun International, and opened in October 2008. The official inauguration and opening of the hotel was held on 17 December 2009 with a performance by Marc Anthony and Jennifer Lopez.

The casino was severely damaged by the 2010 Chile earthquake, and was closed for five months due to reparations valued in USD 10 million.

Revenues 
It is the casino with the main revenues in Chile from 2009.

References

External links

 
 Monticello in Sun International

Casinos in Chile
Casinos completed in 2008